The Federation of Civil Service Organizations (CLO) is a trade union federation of Suriname. It is affiliated with the International Trade Union Confederation.

References

Trade unions in Suriname
International Trade Union Confederation
Civil